Migaama (also known as Migama, Jongor, Djonkor, Dionkor, Dyongor, Djonkor About Telfane) is an Afro-Asiatic language spoken in central Chad. Speakers make up the majority of the population of Bang Bang, Chad.

Notes

References

Abdoullaye, D., and J. Kelly. 1985. On the "compound" tone in Migaama. In: Didier L. Goyvaerts (ed.), African Linguistics: Essays in Memory of M. W. K. Semikenke, 1–7. Amsterdam: John Benjamins.

Boyeldieu, Pascal. 1977. Notes linguistiques. In: Jean-Pierre Caprile (ed.), Études phonologiques tchadiennes, 233–237. Paris: SELAF.

Frajzyngier, Zygmunt, and Wendy Ross. 1996. The structure of the Migaama verbal stem. In: by Petr Zemánek (ed.), Studies in Near Eastern Languages and Literatures. Memorial Volume of Karel Petrácek, 211–221. Prague: Academic of Sciences of the Czech Republic Oriental Institute.

Jungraithmayr, Herrmann. 1975. Der Imperfektivstamm im Migama ('Djonkor von Abu Telfan', Republik Tschad). Folia Orientalia 16:85–100.

Jungraithmayr, Herrmann, and Abakar Adams. 1992. Lexique migama: Migama-français et françaismigama (Guéra, Tchad), avec une introduction grammaticale. Sprache und Oralität in Afrika. Frankfurter Studien zur Afrikanistik. Vol. 7. Berlin: Dietrich Reimer Verlag.

Jungraithmayr, Herrmann. 2003. Pi' 'el/parras/fa' 'al in Chadic? In: M. Lionel Bender, Gábor Takács and David L. Appleyard (eds.), Selected Comparative-Historical Afrasian Linguistic Studies: In Memory of Igor M. Diakonoff, 317–323. Munich: LINCOM Europa.

Jungraithmayr, Herrmann. 2005a. Le paradigme verbal en -U dans les langues chamito-sémitiques. In: Antoine Lonnet and Amina Mettouchi (eds.), Les langues chamito-sémitiques (afro-asiatiques), vol. 1, 65–80. Paris: Ophrys.

Wolff, H. Ekkehard. 1977. Verb bases and stems in Migama. Afrika und Übersee 60:163–177.

External links 
 ELAR archive of A basic documentation of Migaama

East Chadic languages
Languages of Chad